Pedro Manuel Ortiz Domínguez (born 1963), best known by his stage name of Pedro Casablanc, is a Moroccan-born actor known for his many stage, film and television performances in Spain.

Biography 
Pedro Manuel Ortiz Domínguez was born in Casablanca, Morocco, in 1963. Son to Andalusian parents, he earned a licentiate degree in Fine Arts from the University of Seville. He trained his acting chops at the Centro Andaluz de Teatro (CAT), later moving to the Teatro de la Abadía in Madrid.

Filmography 

Film

Television

Accolades

References

External links
 

Living people
1963 births
Spanish male stage actors
Spanish male film actors
Spanish male television actors
21st-century Spanish male actors
University of Seville alumni
People from Casablanca